Malika Ayane (born 31 January 1984) is an Italian pop singer.

Early life
Malika Ayane was born in Milan, Italy, on 31 January 1984, to a Moroccan father, Ahmed, and an Italian mother. She grew up in the Zone 2 of Milan, the most multi-ethnic area of the city. In 1995, she entered the White Voices Choir at the Teatro alla Scala in her hometown, where she sang for seven years. In the meanwhile, she started studying cello at the "Giuseppe Verdi" Conservatory in Milan, where she graduated in 2001.

Career
During the mid 2000s, Ayane recorded songs for some TV spots, including a cover of "Over the Rainbow" for the campaign of Italian food company Yomo in 2005, and the original track "Soul Waver", performed in 2007 for Swedish car manufacturer Saab.

In 2007, Ayane met Italian record producer and former singer Caterina Caselli, which granted her a deal with independent label Sugar Music. As a result, "Soul Waver" was released as her debut single. The song was also re-released in an Italian-language version, "Sospesa", with singer-songwriter Pacifico. "Sospesa" will also feature in the movie Letters to Juliet, released in 2010. Malika Ayane's self-titled first studio album was released on 26 September 2008. The album also spawned the single "Feeling Better", which became a radio hit in 2008, while the track "Il giardino dei salici" was chosen by Barilla for a TV commercial.

In December 2008, Ayane was chosen as one of the contestants of the Newcomers' section of the 59th Sanremo Music Festival. 
During the show, held in February 2009, she performed her entry "Come foglie", written by Negramaro's frontman Giuliano Sangiorgi. During the third night of the show, the song was also performed as a duet with singer-songwriter Gino Paoli.

For Valerio Scanu, contestant of the eighth season of the talent show "Amici di Maria De Filippi", she wrote the song "Dopo Di Me" that reached the ninth position in the Italian charts.

Malika, in April 2009, took part in the song "Domani 21-04-09" with other Italian singers to obtain money to rebuild schools in Abruzzo, the region where the disastrous earthquake centred in L'Aquila and surrounding villages struck on 6 April. In 2010, she was a contestant in the 60th edition of the prestigious Italian song contest Sanremo Music Festival where she won the "Mia Martini" critics award for her song "Ricomincio da qui".

Discography

Albums

Singles

Featured singles

Other appearances

Music videos

Awards and nominations

References

External links

 Official website
 Malika Ayane at AllMusic

1984 births
Living people
Italian pop singers
Italian people of Moroccan descent
English-language singers from Italy
Singers from Milan
21st-century Italian singers
21st-century Italian women singers